Corynophora lativittalis is a species of moth of the family Crambidae described by Francis Walker in 1863. It is known from eastern Australia.

References

Moths described in 1863
Crambinae